The Schlern-Rosengarten Nature Park is a nature reserve in South Tyrol, Italy.

References 
Civic network of South Tyrol

External links 

Schlern-Rosengarten